Sony Music Entertainment US Latin LLC (often referred to as Sony Music Latin) is a record label owned by Sony Music. The label focuses on artists of Latin music.

History 
In 1979, CBS Records (now Columbia Records) ended its partnership with Caytronics after eleven years of distribution. CBS established its own division for Latin music in 1980 called CBS Discos (also known as Discos CBS). In 1988, CBS Records was acquired by Sony and its Latin division was renamed to Sony Discos in 1991. In 2003, Sony Discos was re-branded as Sony Norte following the departure of former Sony Discos president Oscar Llord. A year later, Bertelsmann Music Group (BMG) merged with Sony Music and Sony Norte was renamed to Sony BMG Norte. After BMG sold its assets in 2008, Sony BMG Norte was retitled to its current name Sony Music Latin in 2009.
Alex Gallardo is the current President of Sony Music Latin.

Labels distributed by Sony Music Latin 
 Pina Records
 Premium Latin Music
 DEL Records
 Hand Shake Entertainment
 Top Stop Music
 Anval Music
 Bad Sin

List of artists on Sony Music Latin 
This is a list of artist currently signed on to Sony Music Latin.

 Ana Gabriel
 Dysan & El Apocalypto
 Angelical
 Anna Carina
 Third Voices
 Becky G
 Bomba Estéreo
 Calle 13
 Camilo
 Carlos Vives
 Charlie Zaa
 Chayanne
 ChocQuibTown
 CNCO
 Cristian Castro
 Happy Colors
 Draco Rosa
 Diana Fuentes
 Diego Boneta
 Diego Torres
 Dyland & Lenny
 Edgard Hernandez
 Ednita Nazario
 Enrique Iglesias
 Emilia
 Farina
 F.A.N.S.
 Fortuna La Super F
 Franco De Vita
 Farruko
 Gadiel
 Gente de Zona
 Gerardo Ortiz
 Gilberto Santa Rosa
 Gloria Estefan
 Ha*Ash
 Héctor el Father
 Illya Kuryaki and the Valderramas
 Il Volo
 Jenni Rivera
 Jennifer Lopez
 Julio Iglesias
 Kany García
 Kally's Mashup
 Lali
 Lapiz Conciente
 Leslie Shaw
 Leslie Grace
 Lila Downs
 Limi-T 21
 Lo Blanquito
 Luis Coronel
 Maluma
 Mau y Ricky
 Marc Anthony
 Michel Teló
 Miguel
 Natalia Jiménez
 Natalia Lafourcade
 Nicki Nicole
 Nicky Jam
 Noriel
 OV7
 Ozuna
 Pabllo Vittar
 Paloma Mami
 Pedro Capó
 Pee Wee
 Pizá
 Prince Royce
 Rauw Alejandro
 Raquel Sofía
 Reik
 Ricardo Montaner
 Ricky Martin
 Jean Rodríguez
 Río Roma
 Roberto Carlos
 Romeo Santos
 Samo
 Sasha, Benny y Erik
 Shakira
 Sonus
 Thalía
 Tini
 Víctor Manuelle
 Víctor Gabriel
 Wisin
 Yandel
 Yuri

List of former artists on Sony Music Latin 
These are artists who were formerly signed on to Sony Music Latin.

 Aleks Syntek
 Alejandro Fernández
 Alexis & Fido
 Amaia Montero
 Banda Culiacancito
 Banda Machos
 Beatriz Luengo
 Camila (currently signed to Sony Music Mexico)
 Chambao
 Celia Cruz (Sony Discos)
 Charlie Masso
 Cumbre Norteña
 Da' Zoo
 Daddy Yankee
 Danny Rivera
 Eddie Santiago (Sony Discos)
 El Canto del Loc
 El Compa Chuy
 El Compa Sacra, El Ultimo Razo
 El Gran Combo de Puerto Rico
 Estopa
 Elvis Crespo
 Fito Páez
 Grupo Manía (Sony Discos)
 Grupo Escolta
 Gustavo Cerati
 Gusttavo Lima
 Ha*Ash
 Hombres G
 Huk
 Intocable
 Ivy Queen (Sony Discos)
 Jaci Velasquez (Sony Discos)
 Jerry Rivera
 Jorge Celedón & Jimmy Zambrano (currently signed on to Sony Music Colombia)
 José Feliciano
 José Luis Rodríguez
 Julieta Venegas
 Julio Reyes
 Juan Gabriel
 Juan Magán
 Kalimba
 La 5ª Estación
 La Adictiva Banda San José de Mesillas
 La Mafia
 Leonel García
 Los Buitres de Cuilacan Sinaloa
 Los Cuates de Sinaloa
 La Oreja de Van Gogh
 Los Originales De San Juan
 Los Pikadientes De Caborca
 Los Reyes De Arranque
 Luis Enrique (Sony Discos)
 Lourdes Robles
 Lunna
 Martin Castillo
 Mennores
 NG2
 Noel Schajris
 Noel Torres
 NOTA
 Oscar D'León
 Pandora
 Pitbull
 Playa Limbo
 Raphael
 Revolver Cannabis
 Reyli
 Rey Ruiz (Sony Discos)
 Roberto Carlos
 Rocío Dúrcal
 Santiago Cruz
 Sophy
 Sheryl Rubio
 Sony By Four
 Tempo
 UFF! 
 Toby Love
 Vázquez Sounds
 Vicente Fernández
 Vicentico
 Voltio
 Yanni
 Yolandita Monge
 Yomo
 Yuridia

See also 
 List of Sony Music labels

References

External links 
 

Sony Music Latin
Sony Music
Latin music record labels
Companies based in Miami
Companies based in Miami-Dade County, Florida
Record labels established in 1980
1980 establishments in Florida